Robert Colville may refer to:

Bob Colville (born 1963), English footballer
Robert Colville (died 1584) (1532–1584), Scottish courtier
Robert Colville (Irish MP) (–1697), Irish landowner and politician
Robert E. Colville (1935–2018), American politician and state judge
Robert J. Colville (born 1965), American federal judge

See also
Robert Colvill, the 1st, 2nd and 3rd Lords Colvill of Ochiltree